Poyrazköy is the name of a village (village Poyraz, tr: Poyrazköy) in Beykoz district, Istanbul Province. According to the last census, Poyraz had 904 inhabitants (as of the end of December 2010). Poyraz lies at the exit of the Bosporus into the Black Sea, on the Asian side of the Strait.

According to the Turkish government, the Yavuz Sultan Selim Bridge, the right-hand pillar of the third Bosporus bridge is located here. The pillar on the left is on the European side in the village of Garipçe. The bridge is completed by August 26, 2016.

See also 
The Poyrazköy case

Geography of Istanbul
Beykoz